Cyathus is a genus of fungi in the family Nidulariaceae. Along with the genera Crucibulum, Mycocalia, Nidula and Nidularia, they are known collectively as the bird's nest fungi due to their small nest-like fruiting bodies containing egg-shaped peridioles. The genus Cyathus was monographed by mycologist Lloyd (1906), and later Brodie (1975, 1984), and their species concepts, especially those of Brodie (1975), are followed by most mycologists.

Taxonomic characters

The differentiation of Cyathus species is based on observable characters, such as fruiting body shape, coverings and plications of peridia, and microscopic characteristics such as the anatomy of peridioles, and the size and shape of basidiospores. The following characters are used to help identify Cyathus species:

 Shape
 Size
 Color
 Peridium
 Plication means being folded in pleats.
 Setae are rigid bristles made of compacted hyphae that are sometimes found at the mouth of the peridium.
 The emplacement is the rounded mass of hyphae at the lower, narrow end of the fruiting body which attaches it to the growing surface.

Microscopic characters

 Tunica: a thin membrane that is the outermost covering layer of the peridioles.
 Cortex: in this article, the cortex refers to the tissue layer comprising the wall of the peridiole.
 Spores:

Species

The following list of species is compiled from Brodie's monograph (1975) and subsequent revision (1984), as well as articles written since then describing new species or reducing others to synonymy.

References

Bibliography

 

Nidulariaceae
Cyathus